Ilida is a municipality in the Elis regional unit, West Greece region, Greece. The seat of the municipality is the town Amaliada. The municipality has an area of 400.517 km2. It was named after the ancient region and city Elis.

Municipality
The municipality Ilida was formed at the 2011 local government reform by the merger of the following 2 former municipalities, that became municipal units:
Amaliada
Pineia

References

External links

Municipalities of Western Greece
Populated places in Elis